CardioVascular and Interventional Radiology is a peer-reviewed medical journal published by Springer. It is the journal of the Cardiovascular and Interventional Radiological Society of Europe.

It had an impact factor of 2.191 in 2016. It is abstracted and indexed in Science Citation Index Expanded, Journal Citation Reports/Science Edition, PubMed/MEDLINE, Scopus, EMBASE, Google Scholar, Academic OneFile, CSA Environmental Sciences, Current Contents/Clinical Medicine, EmCare, Gale, Health Reference Center Academic, INIS Atomindex, Mosby yearbooks, OCLC, SCImage, Summon by ProQuest.

External links

References

Springer Science+Business Media academic journals
Cardiology journals
Radiology and medical imaging journals
Publications established in 1978
Bimonthly journals
English-language journals